Charles Humphreys (September 19, 1714 – March 11, 1786) was a signatory to the Continental Association while representing Pennsylvania in the First Continental Congress. He was born in Haverford, Pennsylvania, and was a slave owner, miller, and fuller.

The son of Daniel and Hannah (née Wynne; daughter of Dr. Thomas Wynne) Humphreys, he served as a delegate for Pennsylvania to the Continental Congress from 1774 to 1776. He was a signatory to the Continental Association, however he voted against the Declaration of Independence, since he believed it would inevitably escalate the Revolutionary War and that conflicted with his Quaker beliefs. He withdrew from the Congress soon afterwards. Despite not taking part in the Revolutionary War, his sympathies were with the patriotic cause, and he criticized what he thought was British oppression. Humphreys became the owner of a grist and fulling mill in 1782.

Humphreys and his two sisters Elizabeth and Rebecca were slaveholders. Charles, Elizabeth, and Rebecca owned nine Black people in Haverford Township whose names were Tom, Ceasar, Judy, Nany, Nancy, Dolly, Alice, Fanny, and Tommey. The slave's ages ranged from very young to very old: Tom and Ceasar were adult men; Judy, Nany, Nancy, and Dolly were adult women; and Alice, Fanny, and Tommey were children.

Humphreys died in Haverford in 1786.

References

1714 births
1786 deaths
People from Haverford Township, Pennsylvania
American Quakers
Continental Congressmen from Pennsylvania
18th-century American politicians
Place of birth missing
Place of death missing
Signers of the Continental Association